Ai is an unincorporated community in Fulton County, Ohio, United States, established around 1843. The origin of its name has been a local controversy: some say that it was named after the biblical city of Ai, while others believe that it was named after one of its founders, Ami Richards.  The story continues Ami was a man, so others dropped the 'M' from his name to make the town's name more masculine. Ai has been noted for its short place name.

A post office was established at Ai in 1846, and remained in operation until it was discontinued in 1903. With the construction of the Northern Indiana Air Line railroad during the 1850s, business activity shifted to nearby Swanton and Ai's population dwindled.

References

Unincorporated communities in Fulton County, Ohio
Unincorporated communities in Ohio